is an American-born ice dancer who became a Japanese citizen in 2020. He and his wife, Misato Komatsubara, are the 2020 NHK Trophy gold medalists and four-time Japanese national champions. Together, they also earned a bronze medal from the team event at the 2022 Winter Olympics.

Earlier in his career, Koleto competed with partner Yura Min for South Korea, winning the 2014 national title and placing tenth at the 2014 Four Continents. He also competed with Thea Rabe for Norway.

Personal life 
Koleto was born June 17, 1991, in Kalispell, Montana. He married Misato Komatsubara in January 2017 in Okayama, Japan.

Koleto became a Japanese citizen on November 19, 2020. Upon becoming a Japanese citizen, Koleto legally adopted the Komatsubara surname. Japanese law requires couples to share a surname, and he felt that "to be Japanese but ask my wife to change to a foreign surname I thought was quite strange." He chose the personal name Takeru after consulting his mother-in-law about what name she would have used if she had had another child.

He studies and speaks Japanese.

Career

Early years 
Koleto began learning to skate in 1998. He worked with trainers in his hometown.

He placed 6th in the junior men's category at the 2012 U.S. Championships. In June 2012, he dislocated his knee and partially tore his hamstring and lateral collateral ligament while practicing a triple Axel jump . During practice in December, he twisted his ankle and tore the tibiofibular ligament.

Partnership with Min

2013–14 season 
Koleto switched to ice dancing and teamed up with Yura Min in April 2013. They placed 9th at the 2013 Ukrainian Open in December 2013. They were the only senior ice dance team competing at the 2014 South Korean Championships, and they won with a score of 105.49. Representing South Korea, the duo placed tenth at the 2014 Four Continents Championships. They placed tenth at the 2014 Bavarian Open.

2014–15 season 
They placed eighth at an ISU Challenger Series event, the 2014 CS Nebelhorn Trophy. They finished fifth at their last event together, the International Cup of Nice in October 2014. They were coached by Igor Shpilband and Greg Zuerlein in Novi, Michigan.

Partnership with Rabe 
Koleto had tryouts with Norway's Thea Rabe in November 2014 in Lyon, France, and the following month in Novi, Michigan. They agreed to skate together for Norway. In May 2015, Rabe moved to the United States to train with Koleto. Igor Shpilband, Adrienne Lenda, Fabian Bourzat, and Greg Zuerlein coached the team in Novi, Michigan.

2015–16 season 
After being released by South Korea and sitting out one year, as required by the International Skating Union, Koleto became eligible to compete for Norway beginning October 20, 2015. Making their international debut, Rabe/Koleto won the bronze medal at the Volvo Open Cup in November 2015. They placed 8th at both the Open d'Andorra and the CS Warsaw Cup.  Despite qualifying to the 2016 European Championships, they decided to end their partnership a few weeks before the event. They were Norway's first-ever ice dancing team.

Partnership with Komatsubara

2016–17 season 
Koleto teamed up with Misato Komatsubara following a tryout in Milan in April 2016. They decided to train together in Milan under Barbara Fusar-Poli. They received the bronze medal at the 2016–17 Japan Championships in December 2016.

2017–18 season 
Making their international debut for Japan, Komatsubara/Koleto placed 8th at the CS Lombardia Trophy in September 2017. They finished tenth at their sole Grand Prix event, the 2017 NHK Trophy. The two won the silver medal in December at the 2017–18 Japan Championships. They placed tenth at the 2018 Four Continents Championships with a historic personal best score of 138.18. They placed fourth at the 2018 Toruń Cup.

2018–19 season 
In March 2018, Komatsubara/Koleto announced that they had moved to Montreal, Quebec, Canada, to train under Marie-France Dubreuil, Patrice Lauzon, and Romain Haguenauer at the Gadbois Centre. 

They won bronze at both of their ISU Challenger Series events, the 2018 CS Asian Open Trophy and 2018 CS US International Classic. They competed at two Grand Prix assignments, placing eighth at the 2018 NHK Trophy and eighth at the 2018 Rostelecom Cup.

Following the 2018 Rostelecom Cup, they moved to Japan to train (coached by Rie Arikawa) in order for Koleto to meet a residency requirement for a future citizenship application. At the 2018–19 Japanese Championships, they won the event after placing first in both segments. They placed ninth at the 2019 Four Continents Championships after placing ninth in both segments.  Komatsubara/Koleto represented Japan at their first World Championships in 2019, held in Saitama, where they placed twenty-first in the rhythm dance, missing the free dance by one ordinal.

To conclude the season, they participated in the 2019 World Team Trophy as part of Team Japan, which won the silver medal. Komatsubara/Koleto placed sixth of six competitors in each of their segments. Komatsubara served as the Japanese team captain.

2019–20 season 
Initially scheduled to begin the season at the 2019 CS Autumn Classic International, Komatsubara/Koleto withdrew early in the preseason as a result of Komatsubara having sustained multiple concussions that required her to take time away from training.  They later made their season debut at a different Challenger, the 2019 CS Asian Open, where they finished ninth.  On the Grand Prix, they were tenth out of ten teams at the 2019 Cup of China. They withdrew from the 2019 NHK Trophy.

Returning to competition at the 2019–20 Japan Championships, they won their second consecutive national title.  Komatsubara/Koleto finished eleventh at the 2020 Four Continents Championships. They were assigned to compete at the 2020 World Championships in Montreal, but these were canceled as a result of the coronavirus pandemic.

2020–21 season 
With the pandemic continuing to affect international travel, the ISU opted to base the Grand Prix primarily on the geographic location of competitors. Komatsubara/Koleto were assigned to compete at the 2020 NHK Trophy in a field consisting only of three Japanese dance teams, including the newly debuted pairing of former national champion Kana Muramoto and former Olympic medalist singles skater Daisuke Takahashi. The event occurred a week after Koleto successfully obtained Japanese citizenship, making the team eligible to represent Japan at the Winter Olympics. He said it was "great to share this moment with the Japanese audience." They placed first in the rhythm dance by more than six points. Winning the free dance as well, they took the title, the first Japanese dance team to win the NHK Trophy in its history.

Competing at the 2020–21 Japan Championships, Komatsubara/Koleto placed first in the rhythm dance, four points ahead of Muramoto/Takahashi.  They won the free dance by almost twenty points, and took their third consecutive national title. Both the silver and bronze medalist teams made serious errors. Komatsubara/Koleto were named as Japan's representatives to the 2021 World Championships in Stockholm.  They placed nineteenth, making the free dance for the first time. Komatsubara/Koleto's result qualified for a berth for a Japanese dance team at the 2022 Winter Olympics. They were the first Japanese team in 12 years to qualify directly from the World Championships.

Komatsubara/Koleto finished the season at the 2021 World Team Trophy, where they placed fifth in both of their segments of the competition, and Team Japan won the bronze medal.

2021–22 season 
In preparing their programs for the Olympic season, Komatsubara and Koleto chose a free dance to John Williams's score for Memoirs of a Geisha. Komatsubara felt "there were pieces of our story, pieces of our road, all inside of this music and in this movie."

Komatsubara/Koleto made their season debut at the 2021 Skate America, where they placed sixth. At their second event on the Grand Prix, the 2021 NHK Trophy, they finished in seventh place, 7.30 points behind domestic rivals Muramoto/Takahashi. Koleto said afterward, "there were a lot of things that didn’t go as we wanted them," but expressed satisfaction at having achieved new personal bests. He said their goal was to score over 180 points at the national championships.

The 2021–22 Japan Championships, the final national qualification event for the 2022 Winter Olympics, pitted Komatsubara/Koleto against Muramoto/Takahashi for the second time that season. They won the rhythm dance, and finished second in the free dance to win the title overall, and were subsequently named to the Japanese Olympic team.

Komatsubara/Koleto began the 2022 Winter Olympics as the Japanese entries in the rhythm dance segment of the Olympic team event. They placed seventh in the segment, securing four points for Team Japan. They finished fifth of the five dance teams in the free segment, taking six points for Japan. The Japanese team ultimately won the bronze medal, making the podium for the first time in the history of the team event. In the dance event, Komatsubara/Koleto finished twenty-second in the rhythm dance.

2022–23 season 
After placing seventh at the 2022 CS U.S. Classic, Komatsubara/Koleto were seventh as well at the 2022 Skate Canada International. They finished ninth at the 2022 NHK Trophy.

Komatsubara/Koleto won the silver medal at the 2022–23 Japan Championships, finishing behind Muramoto/Takahashi. Komatsubara said "we are disappointed about the result, but we had a lot of fun."

At the 2023 Four Continents Championships, Komatsubara/Koleto finished sixth in the rhythm dance and seventh overall, remaining ahead of their domestic rivals in both segments. They then finished fourth at the International Challenge Cup.

Programs

With Komatsubara

With Rabe

With Min

Competitive highlights 
GP: Grand Prix; CS: Challenger Series

With Komatsubara for Japan

With Rabe for Norway

With Min for South Korea

Men's singles

Detailed results

With Komatsubara for Japan 
ISU personal best scores highlighted in bold. Historic (i.e., before the 2018–19 season) ISU personal best scores highlighted in bold and italicized.

With Rabe for Norway

With Min for South Korea

References

External links 
 
 
 

1991 births
People from Kalispell, Montana
Japanese male ice dancers
American male ice dancers
Norwegian male ice dancers
South Korean male ice dancers
Living people
Naturalized citizens of Japan
American expatriates in Japan
American expatriates in Norway
American expatriates in South Korea
American emigrants to Japan
Figure skaters at the 2022 Winter Olympics
Olympic figure skaters of Japan
Olympic bronze medalists for Japan
Medalists at the 2022 Winter Olympics
Olympic medalists in figure skating
Mukoyōshi